Filograna is a genus of marine polychaete worms in the family Serpulidae.

Species
The following species are classified in this genus:
Filograna conglobatula Lommerzheim, 1979 †
Filograna implexa Berkeley, 1835

Synonyms
The following genera are synonyms of Filograna:
Filigrana Mörch, 1863 (junior synonym)
Filipora Fleming, 1828 (nomen oblitum)

References

Serpulidae